BRAC Bank and Daily Samakal launched the literary award in 2011 to inspire writers and litterateurs to further enriching Bangla literature with their creative works. Later, Young Writer's Award was dedicated in memory of late legendary novelist Humayun Ahmed. It's also known as BRAC Bank-Samakal Shahitya Puroshkar. The award given in three categories:
 poetry and novel category
 essay, autobiography, travel story and translation category
 Humayun Ahmed Young Writer category
Since its inception the literary award has generated huge enthusiasm in literary community of Bangladesh. Each year in all category more than four hundred books submitted to get award. A total of 472 books were submitted in 2015 for the three categories.

Winners list

2011
 Syed Shamsul Haq
 Dravid Saikot
 Hasan Azizul Haq

2012
 Professor Dr. Anisuzzaman
 Bulbul Chowdhury
 Shuvashis Sinha

2013
 Moinul Ahsan Saber
 Mashrur Arefin
 Badrun Nahar

2014
 Harishangkar Jaldas
 Sushmita Islam
 Muzib Erom

2015
 Nirmalendu Goon
 Rajkumar Singha
 Swakrita Noman

2016
 Ahmad Rafique
 Jyoti Prakash Dutta
 Mazhar Sircar

2017
 Jatin Sarker
 Syed Manzoorul Islam
 Pias Majid

2018
 Sanjida Khatun
 Selina Hossain
 Swaralipi

2019
 Prof Serajul Islam Choudhury
 Helal Hafiz
 Mozaffor Hossain

2020
 Afsan Chowdhury
 Mohammad Rofiq
 Ronjona Bishwas

References

Bangladeshi literary awards